Ludovico Mazzanti (5 December 1686, in Orvieto – 29 August 1775, in Viterbo) was an Italian painter. He was a follower of the school of Giovanni Battista Gaulli, known as Baciccio (died 1709).

Biography
Mazzanti belonged to the Romano-Neapolitan school of artists and carried out his early work in Rome and Orvieto. In Rome he collaborated with Nicolò Pomarancio in the church of Santa Maria Apollinare, while at Orvieto he designed the upper mosaics for the Cathedral façade (1713–1714). He executed many works at Naples, where he was based during the years 1733–1740, and in the Abbey of Montevergine in Campania.

References

External links

Short info at the Città di Castello Cathedral Museum
artnet entry

1686 births
1775 deaths
17th-century Italian painters
Italian male painters
18th-century Italian painters
Italian Baroque painters
18th-century Italian male artists